Louis-Émile Vanderburch (30 September 1794 – 30 March 1862) was a 19th-century French writer and playwright. The painter Dominique Joseph Vanderburch (1722–1785) was his grandfather.

Biography 
After he started a career in teaching as a professor of history, Vanderburch turned to literature and more specifically to theatre. From 1816, he authored more than a hundred theatre plays, some of which were met with great success.

Works 
Theatre (selection)
1835: Jacques II
1836: Le Gamin de Paris
1838: Clermont, ou Une femme d'artiste (with Eugène Scribe)
1846:  Une nuit au Louvre
1854: Le Sanglier des Ardennes
1855: Le sergent Frédéric, comédie en vaudevilles (with Dumanoir)
1863: Peau d'âne

Other
1816: L'Épingle noire
1847: Scènes contemporaines laissées par Madame la Vicomtesse de Chamilly, 1828 collective pseudonym of François-Adolphe Loève-Veimars, Auguste Romieu and Vanderburch.
1832: Souvenirs de France, d'Écosse et d'Angleterre pendant les règnes de François I, Henri II, François II, Marie Stuart et Elisabeth.
1841-1843: Le Gamin de Paris à Alger.
1851: Histoire militaire des Français. À l'usage des écoles régimentaires et des écoles communales.

Bibliography 
 Émile Chevalet, Les 365. Annuaire de la littérature et des auteurs contemporains, 1858.
 Charles Vander-Burch Fils, Biographie d'un homme de lettres, Imprimerie veuve Théolier Ainé et Cie, In-8°, 19 pages, Saint-Etienne, 1863, published by the Bnf, available Here

Funds Vanderburch 
From a gift of Philippe Collin, his great-nephew, the Émile Vanderburch funds gathers at the Bibliothèque nationale de France (Department of Performing Arts) personal papers, the manuscripts of 9 unpublished plays and 8 published plays, 4 collections of poetry and songs, 3 handwritten works of his youth, intimate writings, correspondence, programs, documents related to his theatrical activity and press articles.

References

External links 
 Émile Vanderburch on Data.bnf.fr

19th-century French dramatists and playwrights
Writers from Paris
1794 births
1862 deaths